Transmembrane protein 179 is a protein that in humans is encoded by the TMEM179 gene. The function of transmembrane protein 179 is not yet well understood, but it is believed to have a function in the nervous system.

Gene 
In humans, TMEM179 is located on the long arm of chromosome 14 on the reverse strand and maps to 14q32.33 with the genomic sequence starting at 104,592,993 bp and ending at 104,604,983 bp. Alternative names for this gene are "C14orf90" and "FLJ42486" TMEM179 contains four exons.

mRNA 
There are four isoforms of the TMEM179 protein due to alternative splicing of the pre mRNA transcript.

Protein 
Transmembrane protein 179 is 233 amino acids long. Transmembrane protein 179 has a predicted molecular weight of 26 kDa and a predicted isoelectric point of 5. Both the Homo sapiens and Xenopus laevis proteins contain a much higher than normal level of phenylalanine, a higher than normal level of leucine and tryptophan, and a lower than normal level of proline compared to other proteins from their respective organisms. Both the human and frog proteins have the repetitive structure of “LAFL” appearing twice in their protein which suggests that this repetitive sequence may have some significance.

Subcellular location 
Transmembrane protein 179 is predicted to be localized to the endoplasmic reticulum(ER).

Structure 
Transmembrane protein 179 is predicted to have four transmembrane regions with the N-terminus located on the cytosol side of the membrane. The secondary structure of transmembrane protein 179 is predicted to be made up of mostly alpha helix (52.36%) with some regions of random coil (31.33%) and beta sheets (12.02%). transmembrane protein 179 is predicted to have two disulfide bridges, both located on the ER lumenal side of the membrane.

Post-translational modifications 
Transmembrane protein 179 is predicted to undergo various post-translational modifications such as S-palmitoylation, N-glycosylation, Glycation, Phosphorylation, and O-Linked β-N-acetylglucosamine.

Expression

Normal tissue expression 
TMEM179 has been shown to be most highly expressed in brain and spinal cord tissue. The gene is also relatively highly expressed in tissues in the lungs, adrenal gland, and testis.

Abnormal tissue expression 
TMEM179 has been shown to be relatively highly expressed in glioma cells. TMEM179 has also been shown to be expressed highly in some other cancer cell lines. It was most highly expressed in a small cell lung cancer cell line. It was also expressed in cancer cell lines originating from the brain, renal/urinary/male reproductive systems, and Breast/female reproductive system.

Regulation of Expression 
The TMEM179 promoter was found to start at 104,604,641 bp and end at 104,606,647 bp on the reverse strand using Genomatix's Gene2Promoter tool. Genomatix's MatInspector tool found 732 predicted transcription factor binding sites for this promoter. Some transcription factors that are predicted to bind to the TMEM179 promoter that are of particular interest are EGR1—of which there are four predicted binding sites—and Neuron-Restrictive Silencer Factor (NRSF), both of which are involved in the regulation of neuron growth.

Interacting Proteins 
Transmembrane protein 179 has no known protein interactions.

Homology

Paralogs 
There are no known paralogs of the TMEM179 gene.

Orthologs 
Orthologs of TMEM179 have been found in animals as distantly related to humans as annelids and arthropods, but no orthologs have been found in more distantly related animals such as those in clades Porifera, Nematoda, and Cnidaria. No orthologs have been found in any nonanimal organisms.

Function 
The function of transmembrane protein 179 is not yet well understood. TMEM179 has been identified in a patent involving the production of neural regenerating cells (NRCs) from marrow adherent stem cells (MASCs). According to this patent the methylation of CpG sequences in TMEM179 is decreased in NRCs compared to MASCs. This finding, coupled with the finding that TMEM179 is most highly expressed in the brain and spinal cord, provides strong evidence that transmembrane protein 179 plays a role in nervous system development. This function is also supported by the fact that no orthologs of TMEM179 have been found in nonanimal organisms or animals that lack a nervous system such as sea sponges.

References